Stoyan Kirilov Kitov (born 27 August 1938) is a retired Bulgarian footballer who represented his country at the 1962 and 1966 FIFA World Cups. He played as a midfielder and was a player at Spartak Sofia from 1959 until 1966. He also represented Bulgaria at the 1960 Summer Olympics in Rome, playing one match of football before his team finished 5th overall.

References

External links
 Olympic record
 

1938 births
Footballers from Sofia
Bulgarian footballers
Bulgaria international footballers
First Professional Football League (Bulgaria) players
1962 FIFA World Cup players
1966 FIFA World Cup players
Footballers at the 1960 Summer Olympics
Olympic footballers of Bulgaria
Living people
Association football midfielders